Shul-e Bozorg (also Romanized as Shūl-e Bozorg; also known as Shūl) is a village in Khorram Makan Rural District, Kamfiruz District, Marvdasht County, Fars Province, Iran. At the 2006 census, its population was 936, in 178 families.

References 

Populated places in Marvdasht County